Telenet is a former US particular packet switched network which went into service in 1975.

Telenet may also refer to:
Telenet (Belgium), a Belgian telecommunications company
Telenet Japan, a Japanese video game and software developer

See also
Telnet, a network protocol used on the Internet